The Baltimore Ravens are an American football team based in Baltimore, Maryland. They are currently members of the North division of the American Football Conference (AFC) in the National Football League (NFL). In 1996, the Ravens joined the American Football Conference (AFC) of the National Football League (NFL) after former Cleveland Browns owner Art Modell decided to relocate the team to Baltimore. However, as part of an agreement between Modell, the NFL and the city of Cleveland, Modell left the Browns' name, colors and history in Cleveland. However, the team's players and staff were permitted to move to Baltimore with the franchise. For this reason, the Ravens are considered an expansion team.  The Browns name was later reintroduced in 1999.

Modell had planned to bring Bill Belichick to Baltimore as head coach, but Belichick was fired February 14, 1996. Instead, Modell hired Ted Marchibroda on February 15 as the first head coach of the Ravens franchise in 1996. Marchibroda had previously coached the Baltimore Colts in the 1970s and the Indianapolis Colts in the 1990s. After three seasons, his contract was not renewed. Brian Billick succeeded him after accepting a six-year coaching contract from Modell. Billick went on to lead the Ravens to four playoff appearances in his nine years as coach. In 2000, he led the Ravens to a 34–7 victory in Super Bowl XXXV against the New York Giants. On December 31, 2007, Billick was fired by Ravens owner Steve Bisciotti after leading the Ravens to a 5–11 record in the 2007 season. Less than three weeks later, the Ravens hired John Harbaugh as the franchise's third head coach. Harbaugh reached the playoffs in each of his first five seasons as Ravens head coach, bringing success to the franchise, including a victory in Super Bowl XLVII, in which the Ravens beat the San Francisco 49ers, led by John's brother Jim Harbaugh, by a score of 34–31.

Coaches

Note: Statistics are accurate through end of the 2022 NFL season.

Notes

References
General

 
 
 

Specific

 
Baltimore Ravens
Head coaches